TCG Yavuz (F 240) is the lead ship of  of the Turkish Navy.

Development and design 

Yavuz-class frigates were designed in Germany and are part of the MEKO family of modular warships; in this case the MEKO 200 design. An order for ships was signed by the Turkish government in April 1983 for four MEKO frigates. Two ships were built in Germany and two in Turkey with German assistance. They are similar in design to the larger s of the Turkish Navy, which are improved versions of the Yavuz-class frigate.

The Turkish Navy has an ongoing limited modernization project for an Electronic Warfare Suite. The intent is to upgrade the ships with locally produced the ECM, ECCM systems, active decoys, LWRs, IRST and the necessary user interface systems.

Construction and career 
Yavuz was launched on 7 November 1985 by Blohm+Voss in Hamburg and commissioned on 17 July 1987.

On 11 September 2020, she escorted  in the Mediterranean while on her way to the Port of Marmaris.

References

External links

 The First Upgraded MEKO 200 Frigate Of Turkish Navy
 BARBAROS CLASS ( MEKO 200 Track II) (Turkey)

1985 ships
Ships built in Germany
Yavuz-class frigates